Eulamaops is an extinct genus of camelid, endemic to South America during the Pleistocene (Lujanian, 781,000—12,000 years ago), existing about . Fossil remains of Eulamaops have been found in the Luján Formation in Argentina in areas that would have been open grass and shrub land.  It is estimated to have weighed 150 kilograms

Taxonomy 
Eulamaops was named by Ameghino (1889). It was assigned to the Camelidae by Carroll (1988).

References 

Prehistoric camelids
Prehistoric even-toed ungulate genera
Pleistocene even-toed ungulates
Pleistocene mammals of South America
Lujanian
Pleistocene Argentina
Fossils of Argentina
Fossil taxa described in 1889
Taxa named by Florentino Ameghino